Cedar Grove Cemetery is a historic rural cemetery located at Chaumont in Jefferson County, New York. It is a small cemetery established in 1873 whose pronounced slopes entailed the use of terraced plots.  Retaining walls are largely built of Chaumont limestone.

It was listed on the National Register of Historic Places in 1990.

References

External links
 

Cemeteries on the National Register of Historic Places in New York (state)
1873 establishments in New York (state)
Cemeteries in Jefferson County, New York
National Register of Historic Places in Jefferson County, New York
Rural cemeteries